The Bouquet, Garcin & Schivre (also known as the BGS) was a French electric car manufactured between 1899 and 1906.

References
David Burgess Wise, The New Illustrated Encyclopedia of Automobiles.

External links
 Illustration

Defunct motor vehicle manufacturers of France
Electric vehicles introduced in the 19th century